Daniel Villahermosa Martínez (born 2 January 2001) is a Spanish professional footballer who plays as a midfielder for Spanish club Espanyol B.

Club career
Born in Barcelona, Catalonia, Villahermosa was a youth product of Espanyol since 2009, Villahermosa worked his way up their youth categories, and was first called up to their B team in 2019. He signed a professional contract with the club on 26 July 2021, keeping him at the club until 2024. He made his La Liga and professional debut with Espanyol in a 1–1 tie with Valencia on 14 May 2022, coming on as a substitute in the 68th minute.

References

External links
 
 
 

2001 births
Living people
Footballers from Barcelona
Spanish footballers
La Liga players
Primera Federación players
Segunda Federación players
RCD Espanyol footballers
RCD Espanyol B footballers